C.T.C. (short for Controlul Tehnic de Calitate, Romanian for "Technical quality control", and a stamp formerly present on many products in Romania) is a Romanian hip hop band, founded by VD, Deliric 1,  Doc and DJ Paul.

Discography

See also
Romanian hip hop

External links
Facem Records - official website
Deliric1 - official website

Romanian hip hop groups